The  was the 2018 edition of the annual Japanese national football cup tournament, which began on 26 May 2018 and ended with the final on 9 December 2018 at the Saitama Stadium 2002. The final was held earlier than the usual date of 1 January due to the 2019 AFC Asian Cup.

The draw for the first four rounds was held on 29 March 2018.

As a result of its win, Urawa Red Diamonds automatically qualified to the group stage of the 2019 AFC Champions League.

Calendar

Participating clubs
88 clubs competed in the tournament. Clubs playing in the 2018 J1 League and 2018 J2 League received a bye to the second round of the tournament. The remaining teams entered in the first round.

Results

First round
The first round matches were held on 26 and 27 May 2018.

Second round
The second round matches were held on 6 June 2018.

Notes

Third round
The third round matches were held on 11 July and 22 August 2018.

Notes

Fourth round
The fourth round matches were held on 22 August and 26 September 2018.

Quarter finals
The quarter-finals were held on 24 October 2018 and 21 November 2018.

Semi finals
The semi-finals were originally scheduled to be held on 16 December 2018. However, the semi-finals were rescheduled after Kashima Antlers won the 2018 AFC Champions League, which would have created a scheduling conflict with Kashima's participation in the 2018 FIFA Club World Cup.

Final

The final was originally scheduled to be held on 24 December 2018. However, the semi-finals were rescheduled after Kashima Antlers won the 2018 AFC Champions League, which could have created a scheduling conflict with the 2018 FIFA Club World Cup.

References

External links
Japan Football Association page on the Emperor's Cup (Japanese)

Emperor's Cup
Emperor's Cup
Cup